Vladimir Valentinovich Menshov (17 September 1939 – 5 July 2021) was a Soviet and Russian actor and film director. He was noted for depicting the Russian everyman and working class life in his films. Although Menshov mostly worked as an actor, he is better known for the films he directed, especially for the 1979 melodrama Moscow Does Not Believe in Tears, which won the Academy Award for Best Foreign Language Film. Actress Vera Alentova, who starred in the film, is the mother of Vladimir Menshov's daughter Yuliya Menshova.

Biography
Menshov was born in a Russian family in Baku, Azerbaijan SSR. His father, Valentin Mikhailovich Menshov, was a sailor and later an NKVD officer; his mother Antonina Aleksandrovna Menshova (née Dubovskaya) was a housewife. Because of his father's work, the family lived in Baku, Arkhangelsk and Astrakhan.

As a teenager Menshov worked as a machinist student at a factory, at a mine in Vorkuta, as a sailor on a diving boat in Baku, and also as an understudying actor at the Astrakhan Drama Theater. In 1961 he entered the acting department of the Moscow Art Theatre School. During the second year he married actress Vera Alentova who was also studying at the same theatre school. In 1965 he graduated from the acting department. After graduating, he worked for two years as actor and assistant director at the Stavropol Regional Drama Theater.

In 1970 he graduated from the VGIK postgraduate course in the department of feature film direction (Mikhail Romm's workshop).

From 1970 to 1976, Vladimir Menshov worked under contracts at the film studios Mosfilm, Lenfilm and the Odessa Film Studio. He made a short thesis film On the Question of the Dialectic of the Perception of Art, or Lost Dreams, wrote the stage version of the novel Mess-Mend by Marietta Shaginyan, which was staged at the Leningrad Youth Theater, and wrote the script I'm Serving on the Border at the request of Lenfilm.

In those years his cinematic acting career began: he starred in the title role in the thesis work of his classmate Alexander Pavlovsky Happy Kukushkin. The film was shot at the Odessa Film Studio. Vladimir Menshov also was a co-author of the script. The picture received the main prize at the Molodist-71 Kiev Film Festival Menshov starred in a 1972 film by Alexei Sakharov called A Man in His Place. In 1973 Menshov was awarded the first prize for the best performance at the VI All-Union Film Festival in Almaty.

As an actor, Vladimir Menshov has 117 credits. Some of the most popular films that feature him include How Czar Peter the Great Married Off His Moor (1976), Where is the Nophelet? (1987), Night Watch (2004), Day Watch (2006) and Legend № 17 (2013).

Menshov's directorial debut took place in 1976, it was the film Practical Joke. Menshov's second picture, Moscow Does Not Believe in Tears became one of Russia's box-office record holders, was awarded the State Prize of the USSR, and then the Oscar (1981) as the Best Foreign Language Film. The film tells the story of lives of three women over two decades. It was also a box-office hit.

In 1984, Menchov directed the film Love and Pigeons based on the play of Vladimir Gurkin.

Vladimir Menshov also directed the following films: What a Mess! (1995), The Envy of Gods (2000), and The Great Waltz. The Great Waltz was not finished.

He wrote screenplays for the films I Serve on the Border (1973), The Night Is Short (1981), What a Mess! (1995), The Great Waltz (2008), was the producer of several films, among which: Love of Evil (1998), Chinese Service (1999), Quadrille (1999), The Envy of Gods (2000), Neighbor (2004), A Time to Gather Stones (2005), Shawls (2006), and The Great Waltz.

In 2004, Menshov was the host of the Channel One show Last Hero.

Vladimir Menshov was the general director and art director of "Film Studio Genre", which is a subsidiary of Mosfilm.

In 2011 as the chair of the Russian Academy Award committee he refused to co-sign the decision to nominate Nikita Mikhalkov's film Burnt by the Sun 2: The Citadel as the Russian submission for the 2011 Academy Award for Best Foreign Language Film.

He expressed support for the annexation of Crimea by the Russian Federation and was blacklisted in Ukraine in 2015 as a result.

Awards

Vladimir Menshov – Honored Artist of the RSFSR (1984), People's Artist of Russia (1989), winner of the State Prizes of the RSFSR (1978, for the film Rally) and the USSR (1981, for the film Moscow Does not Believe in Tears).

 The Order of Merit for the Fatherland, IV degree (1999)
 The "For Services to Moscow" badge (30 July 2009)
 The Order of Merit for the Fatherland, III degree (2010)
 The Golden Eagle Award as Best Supporting Actor in Legend No. 17 (2014)
 The Order of Merit for the Fatherland, II degree (2017)

Personal life and death
Menshov married actress Vera Alentova in 1962. They had a daughter, Yuliya Menshova.

He died at age 81, as a consequence of COVID-19.

Partial filmography

As a director

As an actor

References

External links
 

1939 births
2021 deaths
20th-century Russian male actors
21st-century Russian male actors
Film people from Baku
Academicians of the National Academy of Motion Picture Arts and Sciences of Russia
Academicians of the Russian Academy of Cinema Arts and Sciences "Nika"
Directors of Best Foreign Language Film Academy Award winners
Gerasimov Institute of Cinematography alumni
Academic staff of the Gerasimov Institute of Cinematography
Academic staff of High Courses for Scriptwriters and Film Directors
Moscow Art Theatre School alumni
People's Artists of the RSFSR
Recipients of the Order "For Merit to the Fatherland", 2nd class
Recipients of the Order "For Merit to the Fatherland", 3rd class
Recipients of the Order "For Merit to the Fatherland", 4th class
Recipients of the USSR State Prize
Russian film directors
Russian male film actors
20th-century Russian screenwriters
Male screenwriters
20th-century Russian male writers
Soviet film directors
Soviet male film actors
Soviet screenwriters
United Russia politicians
Deaths from the COVID-19 pandemic in Russia